Ricci Riera, is an American record producer, DJ and songwriter from Los Angeles, California. He is best known for his production with notable hip hop artists such as Kendrick Lamar, Drake, Travis Scott, Schoolboy Q, Overdoz, and ASAP Rocky among others. Aside from his solo production, Riera was previously a member of the Grammy Nominated LA production duo THC. Riera scored his first Grammy nomination as a solo producer with "U With Me?" on the second best selling album of 2016, Views. Ricci most recently appeared twice on Kendrick Lamar's much anticipated 3rd studio album Damn. producing on songs "Element" co produced by James Blake and "God".

Production discography

Notable songs produced on major albums

List of songs as producer or co-producer, with performing artists, showing year released and album name and certification.

Other songs 

Kendrick Lamar - Section.80 (2011)
 1. "Fuck Your Ethnicity"
 5. "Tammy's Song (Her Evils)"
 10. "Chapter Ten"
(2012)
 "Cartoons and Cereal"
Iman Omari- Energy (2011)
 3. "Midnight"
 5. "First Time" (featuring Joon)
Overdoz- Live For, Die For (2011)
 1."Live For, Die For"
 2. "Before We Go On"
 3. "Don't Wanna Be Your GF" (featuring Skeme)
 5. "It Girl"
 8. "Pasadena"
 9. "The Function"
 10."Wanna Know Your Name"(featuring Casey Veggies)
 11. "Come First"
 12. "Taking Me Down" (featuring Kendrick Lamar)
 14. "Got Me F**ked Up"
 15. "Counting My Money" (featuring Dom Kennedy) 
Dom Kennedy-  Yellow Album (2012)
 1. "So Elastic"
 5. "Girls On Stage"
 6. "Don't Call Me" (featuring Too Short)
 7. "5.0"
Schoolboy Q- Habits & Contradictions- (2012)
 4. "Sex Drive" (featuring Jhené Aiko)
 5. "Oxy Music"
Skeme- Alive and Living (2012)
 "Kidz With Gunz (featuring Schoolboy Q)

Overdoz- BOOM (2013)
 1. "Underground" (featuring Pimp C)
 2. "These Niggas" (featuring Nipsey Hussle)
 3. "FSWAD"
 5. "Destos Don't Stress Hoes"
 6. "Killer Tofu"
 8. "De$tabil"
 10. "Barbary Coast"
 11."When I Woke Up"
 12."Thinkin"
 13. "Lois Lane"
Nipsey Hussle- Mailbox Money- (2014)
 8. "Between Us" (featuring K Camp)
 10. "Stay Loyal" (featuring J. Stone)
 12. "No N***a Like Me" (featuring Trae Tha Truth)

References 

Record producers from California
Musicians from Los Angeles
1985 births
Living people